Radostín nad Oslavou is a market town in Žďár nad Sázavou District in the Vysočina Region of the Czech Republic. It has about 900 inhabitants.

Administrative parts
The village of Zahradiště is an administrative part of Radostín nad Oslavou.

References

Populated places in Žďár nad Sázavou District
Market towns in the Czech Republic